Kevin Spencer (born November 2, 1953) is an American football coach.

Early coaching career
In 1975, Spencer coached wrestling and lacrosse at the State University of New York as a graduate assistant. From 1976-1979 he coached at Detroit County Day High School in Birmingham, Michigan. Spencer spent the next two years as a graduate assistant at Cornell University. After coaching for one season at Gilman School in Baltimore, Maryland, Spencer received a job coaching at Ithaca College. From 1981-1985, he was the head freshman coach and in 1986 he served as the offensive coordinator. Spencer moved to Wesleyan University where he was the head coach for five years (1987-1991). With a 6-2 record in 1990, he finished with an overall record of 14-26. From 1989-1990, Spencer coached the Cleveland Browns and New York Jets former head coach Eric Mangini.

Cleveland Browns
Spencer began his NFL career with the Cleveland Browns as a coaching assistant under Bill Belichick in 1991. His final season with the team was in 1994.

Oakland Raiders
Spencer moved to the Oakland Raiders in 1995. Under Mike White, he served as quality control coach for the 1995 season. In 1996, he was named assistant linebackers coach. In 1997, new head coach Joe Bugel named him defensive assistant.

Indianapolis Colts
In 1998, Spencer was hired by the Indianapolis Colts as special teams coach Jim E. Mora. He held this position until the 2001 season, the same year Mora left the team.

Pittsburgh Steelers
Signing with the Pittsburgh Steelers in 2002, Spencer was a member of the staff when the Steelers won Super Bowl XL. In 2003, Spencer was named Special Teams Coach of The Year.

Arizona Cardinals
Following the 2006 season, former Steelers offensive coordinator Ken Whisenhunt was named head coach of the Arizona Cardinals.  Spencer was allowed out of the final year of his contract with the Steelers to coach for the Cardinals. Spencer made his second Super Bowl appearance in 2009 with the Cardinals.

San Diego Chargers
On January 22, 2013, Spencer was named the special teams coach of the San Diego Chargers, reuniting him with Whisenhunt.

On December 2, 2015 Spencer was fired as the Chargers special teams coach.

Personal life
Spencer and his wife, Rosemarie, have two sons, Timothy and Jack. He has two children, Lindsey and Zachery from a previous marriage.

References

External links
 Pro Football History bio

1953 births
Living people
Arizona Cardinals coaches
Cleveland Browns coaches
Cornell Big Red football coaches
Indianapolis Colts coaches
Ithaca Bombers football coaches
Oakland Raiders coaches
Pittsburgh Steelers coaches
San Diego Chargers coaches
Springfield Pride football players
Wesleyan Cardinals football coaches